The Code of Federal Regulations, Telecommunications, containing the U.S. federal regulations for telecommunications can be found under Title 47 of the United States Code of Federal Regulations.

Commonly referenced parts
Part 15—concerning unlicensed broadcasts and spurious emissions
Part 18—concerning industrial, scientific, and medical (ISM) radio bands
Part 68—concerning direct connection of all terminal equipment to the public switched telephone network
Part 73—Radio Broadcast Services
Part 74—Remote Broadcast Pickup
Part 80—Maritime Service
Part 87—concerning aviation services
Part 90—concerning licensed wireless communications for businesses and non-federal governments
Part 95—concerning GMRS, FRS, MURS, and CB radio
Part 97—concerning amateur radio

See also
 FCC Record

External links
 Cornell Law, Legal information institute reference for Title 47
 FCC, Electronic Code of Federal Regulations (e-CFR) -Title 47-
 GPO Bookstore, Code of Federal Regulations (CFR)
 GPO, Electronic Code of Federal Regulations, Title 47 Telecommunication

References

United States communications regulation
Federal Communications Commission
 47